100% Entertainment is a Taiwanese entertainment news and variety show broadcast on GTV Variety Show. It is broadcast from Monday to Friday from 20:00 to 21:00 and repeats at 01:00, 06:00, 10:00 and 18:00 on the day after, with reviews on Saturdays. There are live broadcasts every Tuesdays and Wednesdays from the recording studio, on entertainment news, sometimes with guests in attendance; the other days are pre-recorded variety specials and Sundays are repeats or other shows. There are no airings of the show on January 1.

Host

Mondays to Fridays
 First batch – 5 May 1997:  (Cai Rong Zu)
 Second batch – 13 October 1997：
 Third batch – 16 March 1998：Da S and Xiao S
 2000: Da S and Xiao S on leave for one month – Blackie Chen and Aya Liu filled in as replacements
 Fourth batch – August 2003：Da S, Xiao S and Blackie Chen (and Show Lo as locum)
 Fifth batch – 2005：Da S, Xiao S, Show Lo (and Alien Huang as locum)
 September 2005: Xiao S on maternity leave
 November 2005: Da S resigned
 17 November 2005: Alien Huang filled in as replacement whilst Xiao S on maternity leave
 April 2006: Xiao S came back from maternity leave but resigned in August 2006
 Seventh batch – Show Lo, Alien Huang and Linda Chien
 February 2011: Linda Chien becomes an official host and no longer a replacement.
 Eighth batch – 12 November 2012: Show Lo, Alien Huang and Linda Chien, with  @ Lollipop F and Owodog @ Lollipop F as locum during Show & Alien's extended leave for their respective concert tours.
 February 2013: Owodog and William become the official host and no longer are replacements
 Ninth batch – 7 April 2015: Show Lo, Alien Huang and Linda Chien, with William Liao @ Lollipop F. (and Shanny Tu (better known as Arnold), Awayne @ Lollipop F and Mini Cai as locum)
 Owodog did not extend his contract, and reverted to being a locum.
 Alien takes indefinite leave of at least 2 years as a host on 6 December 2015 to concentrate as a singer and actor, will return as a guest. 
 Tenth batch – Show Lo, Alien Huang and Linda Chien, with William Liao @ Lollipop F (with Wish Chu &  @ , Chris Chiu @ JPM and SpeXial as locum and correspondent)
 Eleventh batch – 10 April 2017 - Show Lo, Linda Chien, William Liao @ Lollipop F, Wish Chu & Masha Pan @ GTM, and Chris Chiu @ JPM (all promoted from locum)
 William takes indefinite leave as a host on 19 December 2017 (with his send-off episode aired on December 30, 2017) to concentrate as an actor, will return as a guest, the fact he was not on the nominated list for Golden Bell Awards twice also attributing to the decision.
 Twelfth batch – 8 February 2018: Show Lo, Linda Chien, Chris Chiu, Wish Chu & Masha Pan @ GTM, Wayne Huang @ SpeXial (until September 2018 for military enlistment), Feng Tian (Win) @ SpeXial
 Chris Chiu and Win were promoted from locum and outdoor correspondents.
 Wish Chu and Masha Pan @ GTM left takes indefinite leave as host due to contract issues.
 Thirteenth batch – 27 December 2018: Show Lo, Linda Chien, Chris Chiu, Feng Tien
 Feng Tien left his host position for other work.
 Fourteenth batch – 23 July 2019: Show Lo, Linda Chien, Chris Chiu
 Fifteenth batch – 13 August 2019: Show Lo, Linda Chien, Chris Chiu, Wayne Huang (and Kenny Khoo as locum)
 Kenny Khoo becomes an official host.
 Chris Chiu left his position as host for personal development.
 Sixteenth batch – March 2020: Show Lo, Linda Chien, Wayne Huang, Kenny Khoo, 
 Show Lo and Linda Chien takes leave due to breakout of negative news on their relationship.
 Seventeenth batch - November 2020: Wayne Huang, Kenny Khoo, Nine Chen
 On the November 2020 edition of the monthly show introduction booklet from Gala Television, Show Lo and Linda Chien were removed from the list of hosts of the show, while Shou Lou and Lai were added to the list, but Shou and Lai were removed from the list again on the February 2021 edition.

Saturdays and Sundays
 First batch – November 2000：Blackie Chen and Aya Liu
 Second batch – 8 November 2000：Blackie Chen and Show Lo
 Third batch – 12 June 2002：Blackie Chen, Show Lo and Makiyo
 Fourth batch – end-2002: Xiao Xian (小嫻) and Hong Chih-te (洪其德)
There are no more weekend hosts after the fourth batch, the Saturdays shows are pre-recorded, Sunday shows is a re-run of a previously pre-recorded episode.

Current Segments 

 100% Live (百分百 LIVE)
 Peanut Magic (花生省魔術, homophonic of "發生甚麼事", lit. What has happened)
 OWO Werewolf
 Pro's Guide (高玩攻略)
 Save Me, Master 09 (師父零九救我)
 OWO Wereword (凹嗚狼來了)
 School with Class 2-8 (二年八班開學了)
 WE~ Wayne with Singers (WE~晉愛唱)
 WE~ Wayne with Celebs (WE~晉大咖)

 I Have a Star at Home (我家也有大明星)
 OWO Contest (凹嗚大對抗)
 28 Café (貳拾捌咖啡)
 Entertainers' Game (娛民遊戲)
 Board Game Research Club (桌遊研究社)
 Ding-dong W0LF(S)
 W0LF(S) Dorm (凹嗚五宿舍)
 W0LF(S) Chit-chat (五堅情的五四三)

Awards and nominations

Broadcast information 
 Taiwan - GTV Variety Show: Everyday; 18:00 to 19:00 (repeats: 01:00, 06:00 and 10:00)

See also
 List of 100% Entertainment episodes (2004 to 2007)
 List of 100% Entertainment episodes (2008)

References

External links
  GTV - 100% Entertainment website
  GTV - 100% Entertainment forum
  GTV - 100% Entertainment VOD
  100% Entertainment on Facebook (official)

Taiwanese variety shows